Koreni may refer to:
Koreni (settlement), in Kenya's Coast Province
Koreni (novel), by Serbian author Dobrica Cosic published in 1954